Margarita is a comune (municipality) in the Province of Cuneo in the Italian region Piedmont, located about  south of Turin and about  east of Cuneo.

Margarita borders the following municipalities: Beinette, Chiusa di Pesio, Mondovì, Morozzo, and Pianfei.

References

Cities and towns in Piedmont